The 1968 Minor States Carnival, known more formally as the 1968 ANFC Division 2 Championship was an edition of the lower division of Australian National Football Carnival, an Australian rules football interstate competition. The competition was won by the Australian Amateurs.

The competition was held in Canberra on the Queen's Birthday long weekend. The format was a simple knock-out tournament. The winner received the R. T. Rush Trophy, named after ANFC president Bob Rush.

Results

References

Australian rules interstate football
ANFC Division 2 Championships, 1968